Aira Bermudez (born September 6, 1983), is a Filipina dancer and actress. She is the former leader of Philippine dance group, the SexBomb Girls after the succession of Rochelle Pangilinan from 2011 to 2017, also she is head choreographer and co-manager. She can be seen in Daisy Siete and co-hosted a limited-run dance program on QTV-11, Let's Get Aww!. She has been a member of the SexBomb Girls from 2000 to 2017.

Discography

Albums
2002: Sexbomb's Sexiest Hits (Gold)
2002: Sexbomb: I Like & Other Hits (Gold)
2003: Sexbomb's Sexiest Hits 2 (Gold)
2004: Sexbomb's Sexiest Hits 3 (4× Platinum)

Filmography

Films

Television

Statistics
Height: 5'4"
Weight: 105 lbs.
Eye colour: brown
36-24-36

References

External links

Biography on GMA celebrities
Official Website of the SexBomb Girls

1983 births
Filipino dance musicians
Living people
People from Pampanga
People from Tondo, Manila
Actresses from Manila
21st-century Filipino actresses
Filipino female dancers
SexBomb Girls members
GMA Network personalities
Participants in Philippine reality television series
Survivor Philippines contestants